Angling was contested at 1900 Olympics in Paris. At a series of competitions in August, some 600 fisherman, of whom 40 were from 5 countries other than France, participated in 6 separate events. These events have generally not been classified as official, although the IOC has never decided which events were "Olympic" and which were not. There was no such designation at the time of the Games.

Six "heats" of 100 anglers took place : Sunday morning for "foreigners", Sunday afternoon and two on Monday for non-Parisians, and two on Tuesday for the "local" fishermen. The first ten anglers of each heat, having taken the most fish, qualified for the "concours d'honneur" (final) on Wednesday.

Résults (1.800 francs of prices: 200 for the biggest fish and 100 to be distributed among the first ten anglers with the most fish):
 Heat 1, Sunday morning, "foreigners" : 17 fish (only nine anglers rated)
 Heat 2, Sunday afternoon, non-Parisians : 104 fish
 Heat 3, Monday morning, non-Parisians : 78 fish
 Heat 4, Monday afternoon, non-Parisians : 66 fish
 Heat 5, Tuesday morning, Parisians : 264 fish
 Heat 6, Tuesday afternoon, Parisians : 641 fish

During one of the non-Parisians heats, Madame B., member of the Fishermen Society of Amiens, finished among the first ten and so qualified for the "final" on Wednesday.

During the "concours d'honneur" (final) on Wednesday 57 anglers competed. They caught 881 fish and won a total of 3.800 francs. The jury used the name of their fishing society for the final ranking:

Biggest fish : Élie Lesueur (Amiens) "world champion": the Président de la République Émile Loubet gave him a cup;

then :
 M. Goethiers (Louveciennes) ;
 Hyacinthe Lalanne (Amiens), 47 fish ;
 Paris ;
 Paris ;
 Paris.

Sources 
 .
 .
 .

References

External links
 La Vie au grand air August 19, 1900
GB Athletics - Olympic Games Medallists - Other Sports - Demonstration & Unofficial Sports

1900 Summer Olympics events
Olympics 1900
Discontinued sports at the Summer Olympics